Ng Mui Wui (born 31 March 1997) is a para table tennis player from Hong Kong. She won a bronze at the women's Class 11 singles event held at the 2016 Summer Paralympics.

Ng has congenital intellectual disability.

Career
Ng's first table tennis tournament was the 2011 Asian and Oceanic Championships. She won a silver medal at the 2014 Asian Para Games's individual Class 11 event. Later, she went on to represent Hong Kong at the 2016 Summer Paralympics held in Rio de Janeiro, where she advanced until the semifinals of Women's individual – Class 11 event but lost to Natalia Kosmina of Ukraine. In the bronze medal match she defeated Wong Ka Man of her own country and secured the first medal for Hong Kong at the 2016 Paralympics.

In 2017 she won gold metals at the 4th Taichung Open for the Disabled's women's TT11 category and the team event of Asian Para Table Tennis Championships. At the World Para Team Championships held the same year, her team secured the second position.

References

1997 births
Living people
Hong Kong female table tennis players
Table tennis players at the 2016 Summer Paralympics
Paralympic medalists in table tennis
Paralympic bronze medalists for Hong Kong
Medalists at the 2016 Summer Paralympics
Sportspeople with intellectual disability
Paralympic table tennis players of Hong Kong
Table tennis players at the 2020 Summer Paralympics
21st-century Hong Kong women